Ludlum may refer to:

 Ludlum Measurements, an American manufacturer of radiation detection and monitoring equipment

People
 David M. Ludlum (1910–1997), American historian, meteorologist, entrepreneur, and author
 Robert Ludlum (1927–2001), American author of 27 thriller novels
 Alia Moses (previously Alia Moses Ludlum; born 1962), District Judge of the United States District Court for the Western District of Texas